The University of Hartford (UHart) is a private university in West Hartford, Connecticut. Its  main campus extends into neighboring Hartford and Bloomfield. The university is accredited by the New England Commission of Higher Education.

History
The University of Hartford was chartered through the joining of the Hartford Art School, Hillyer College, and The Hartt School in 1957. Prior to the charter, the University of Hartford did not exist as an independent entity.

The Hartford Art School, which commenced operation in 1877, was founded by a group of women in Hartford, including Harriet Beecher Stowe and Mark Twain's wife, Olivia Langdon Clemens, as the Hartford Society for Decorative Art. Its original location was at the Wadsworth Atheneum, the first public art museum in the United States. It is still associated with the museum today.

Hillyer College, which was named for the U.S. Civil War General Charles Hillyer, was created as a part of the Hartford YMCA in 1879. In the early 20th century, it provided instruction in automotive technology at a time when Hartford was a center for the budding automobile industry. In 1947, it was formally separated from the YMCA and saw an influx of World War II veterans seeking a college education under the G.I. Bill. In the three school merger, Hillyer brought its College of Education, Nursing and Health Professions; the Barney School of Business; the College of Engineering, Technology and Architecture; the College of Arts and Sciences; and the contemporary Hillyer College, formerly known as the College of Basic Studies.

The Hartt School was founded in 1920 by Julius Hartt and Moshe Paranov. It remains today as the University of Hartford's comprehensive performing arts conservatory, and is regarded among the most recognized schools for music, dance, and theatre in the United States.

Since 1988, the university has been a lead institution for the Connecticut Space Grant College Consortium.

In the 1990s, pledging its commitment to women's education, the university bought the financially struggling Hartford College for Women (HCW). In 2003 the university announced that it would close the Hartford College for Women and transition all of its degree programs into the College of Arts and Sciences.

Although it is a private institution, the university hosts two magnet schools that serve students from Hartford and its surrounding suburbs: University of Hartford Magnet School (serving grades K–5) and University High School of Science and Engineering (serving grades 9–12).

Under President Walter Harrison, the university completed several ambitious building projects, including a new residence hall, Hawk Hall; the $34 million Integrated Science, Engineering, and Technology (ISET) complex; the Renée Samuels Center; the Mort and Irma Handel Performing Arts Center; and a new University High School building, in the summer of 2008, the bridge over the Park River connecting the academic and residential sides of campus was rebuilt.

In 2021, University of Hartford announced it will begin the process to move all of its 17 athletic programs from Division I to Division III. Students and alumni from the University of Hartford attempted to sue the university, claiming that the university "reneged on its commitment" to the student-athletes. The university filed its intent to move to Division III in January 2022 and is expected to become a member of DIII no later than September 1, 2025, unless the move is halted in the courts.

Academics
The University of Hartford has less than 6,000 full-time and part-time graduate and undergraduate students. The university offers 82 bachelor's degree programs, 10 associate degrees, 28 graduate degrees, and 7 certificates or diplomas. Starting with the 2019–2020 academic year, the university will launch a bachelor's degree program in nursing. The student-faculty ratio is nearly 9:1. The university's academics are organized into seven schools and colleges:

Barney School of Business
College of Arts and Sciences
College of Education, Nursing and Health Professions
College of Engineering, Technology, and Architecture
Hartford Art School
The Hartt School
Hillyer College

Faculty

Glen Adsit
Walter Bishop, Jr., former
Miguel Campaneria, former
Robert Carl
Rabbi David G. Dalin, former
Steve Davis
Benjamin Grossberg
Eddie Henderson
Hotep Idris Galeta
Randy Johnston
Andy LaVerne
 Jacob Lissek 
Jackie McLean, former
René McLean
Ralph Nader, former
Lynn Pasquerella, former provost
Nat Reeves
Jonathan Rosenbaum, former
Sandy Skoglund, former
Humphrey Tonkin

Campus

The Village Lawn
Situated between the residential apartments, it hosts university-sponsored spring fling events. Past entertainment has included: The Mighty Mighty Bosstones, Vanilla Ice, Gym Class Heroes, T-Pain, The Black Eyed Peas, Ying Yang Twins, Method Man, Common, Cypress Hill, French Montana, Waka Flocka Flame, PnB Rock, Cranium, Studio 205, New Found Glory, and Sammy Adams.

Gengras Student Union

This houses the student government, the university post office, student organizations including the student newspaper The Informer and the Student Television Network (STN), a cafeteria, a convenience store, and the Gengras food court, featuring Einstein Bros. Bagels, Burger Studio, and Moe's. A major renovation of the Gengras Student Union began in early 2017.

The Harry Jack Gray Center

Centrally located on campus, the Harry Jack Gray Center houses the Mortensen Library and the Allen Memorial Library. After the renovation of the library in 2016, the university announced the library would be renamed Harrison University Libraries in honor of University President Walter Harrison. Also located here are the Joseloff Gallery, the university bookstore, the School of Communications, the Visual Communication Design Department, the Department of Architecture, WWUH (91.3 MHz FM) radio station, the Wilde Auditorium, the Kent McCray Television Studio, the Gray Conference Center, the Museum of Jewish Civilization, and the 1877 Club restaurant. It was the former home of the Museum of American Political Life, which housed the second largest collection of political memorabilia in the United States after the Smithsonian. The museum was closed in 2003 and that space now houses the Department of Architecture.

Alfred C. Fuller Music Center

The main Hartt School Complex, the center is composed of Millard Auditorium, Paranov Hall, and O'Connell Hall, a one-story extension of Paronov Hall. Originally, Abrahms Hall was included in the Fuller Complex. A renovation of Millard Auditorium was completed in 2017.

Beatrice Fox Auerbach Hall

Auerbach Hall is named after businesswoman Beatrice Fox Auerbach. It is one of the largest academic buildings on campus and is home to the Barney School of Business. During the 2018–19 academic year, Auerbach Hall underwent a major renovation which included a 10,000-square-foot addition for the Barney School including additional classrooms and a trading room.

Hillyer Hall
Built in 1962, Hillyer Hall was the first classroom building on campus. Hillyer Hall is home to the College of Arts and Sciences, College of Education, and Hillyer College. In 2012, the Shaw Center was completed to provide additional classrooms and offices for Hillyer College. The building is named after John C. "Jay" Shaw (Class of '74) and wife Debi of Greenwich, who donated $1.5 million to the project.

Dana Hall-Integrated Science, Engineering, and Technology Complex (ISET)

Dana Hall houses the College of Engineering, Technology, and Architecture (CETA). It consists of three buildings: United Technologies Hall, Charles A. Dana Hall (the largest building of the complex), and a  building housing biology and chemistry facilities.

University of Hartford Magnet School
The University of Hartford is the first private university in the country to have a public magnet school located on campus. Many education majors complete fieldwork, practicum, and student teaching here. Students attending the school are bused in from the greater Hartford area.

University High School of Science and Engineering

This public magnet high school, formerly located on the university's Albany Avenue campus, is now located on the east side of the campus. The University High School was established in 2004 as a partnership of the Hartford Public Schools, the University of Hartford, and the Capitol Region Education Council. It is based on the early college initiative mode: University High School students are able to earn college credits while they attend high school. The high school enrolls two hundred students, seventy percent of whom are from Hartford. The other thirty percent come from towns in central Connecticut. Students are selected through a lottery from a pool of applicants, as required by the state of Connecticut.

Mort and Irma Handel Performing Arts Center

Dedicated in 2008, the Mort and Irma Handel Performing Arts Center is a facility that is the instructional home for collegiate and Community Division students studying Theatre, Musical Theater and Dance at the Hartt School. It contains five dance studios, four theatre rehearsal studios, three vocal studios, and two black box theatres, as well as faculty offices, a community room, and a cafe. The facility is located on the Westbourne Parkway in Hartford, on the old site of the Thomas Cadillac dealership. The building is named after Morton E. Handel and his wife Irma.

Hartford Art School-Renee Samuels Center

Dedicated in 2007, The Renee Samuels Center provides a home for the photography and media arts programs.

University Commons
A residential dining hall, it is in the center of the freshmen living area. Located on the ground floor is the Hawk's Nest, which offers food, pool, and several large-screen TVs. The Hawk's Nest hosts Friday-night music performances, which include local and national acts as well as student performances. A $10 million renovation of The Commons commenced in May 2014 and completed that following September. The new facility includes a sushi station, salad and soup bar, stir fry station, and a sandwich section.

The University Residences
There are four different styles of on-campus housing. All provide students with access to the university's T-3 broadband internet network, cable television, and telephones.

Six residential suite-style complexes - A through F - are each capable of housing 312 students. All complexes feature study lounges, laundry facilities, and activity rooms.

Regents Park consists of suite-style independent living for sophomores and juniors. It is a large building of four wings of suites typically outfitted with a living room and partial kitchen. It has north, south, east, and west wings.

The Village Apartments, consisting of seven quads (four groupings of apartments forming a rectangular area), are an independent-living apartment area for upperclassmen. Each apartment has a kitchen and can house two to six students.

Park River Apartments provides apartment-style independent living for third- or fourth-year students. Each unit is a full apartment complete with a full-size bathroom and a kitchen (including a full-size refrigerator, dishwasher, sink, and cabinets).

Hawk Hall houses 204 freshmen and eight resident assistants. Hawk Hall features Residential Learning Communities (RLC), grouped by wings on each floors. Some RLC themes (past and present) include Women in Science, Engineering, and Technology (WISET), Wellness, Leadership, Destinations, Environmental Awareness, the Adult Journey, Honors: Making a Difference in The World, Community Service, and Hawk Spirit. The five-story residence hall has lounges with floor-to-ceiling windows. The first floor includes a spacious lounge with a flat-screen TV, two SMART classrooms, and a kitchen.

Konover Campus Center
This includes a market, Subway, and an indoor eating area.

Chase Arena at Reich Family Pavilion

Chase Arena at Reich Family Pavilion is home to the men's and women's basketball teams and the women's volleyball team. Opened in 1990, the arena is named in honor of the Chase Family in West Hartford. Included in the building is the Mary Baker Stanley Pool and the university's athletic administration offices. Entertainment at the arena has included Girl Talk, Wale, and Ludacris. Past visiting politicians include Governor Dannel P. Malloy, former President Bill Clinton, and President Barack Obama.

Asylum Avenue Campus

It contains a cafeteria, computer lab, and studio space.

Organization and administration

Student government
The university's student government association (SGA) promotes student awareness and involvement, and represents the voice of the students. The elected representatives of the SGA are the president, five vice presidents, two student regents, and senators. The senators represent each of the colleges, classes, and residence halls.

List of university presidents
Vincent B. Coffin (1959–1967)
Archibald M. Woodruff (1967–1977)
Stephen Joel Trachtenberg (1977–1998)
Humphrey Tonkin (1989–1998)
Walter Harrison (1998–2017)
Gregory S. Woodward (2017–)

A cappella groups
Such groups at the University of Hartford are governed by the A Cappella Coalition and hold auditions at the beginning of each year for new members.
 L'shir
 Hawkapella
 Uharmonies
 HartAttack

Campus publications
Aerie, literary journal
Icon, yearbook
The Informer, student newspaper

Faith organizations
Chabad on Campus International Foundation
Hillel: The Foundation for Jewish Campus Life
Intervarsity Christian Fellowship - ICF
The Newman Club
Muslim Students Association

Music for a Change
Launched in the spring of 2000, the Music for a Change benefit concert series raises money for Greater Hartford charities and nonprofit organizations. Headliners have included Arlo Guthrie, Alison Krauss and Union Station, Art Garfunkel, Aztec Two-Step, Citizen Cope, Dionne Warwick, George Winston, Jonathan Edwards, Kris Kristofferson, Marc Cohn, Pat Metheny, Richie Havens, Shawn Colvin, Susan Tedeschi, Tom Paxton, Tom Rush, The Wailers, and Wynton Marsalis.

Greek life

Athletics

The Hartford Hawks participate in the NCAA Division I level as an independent; men's golf competes in the Big Sky Men's Golf Conference, women's golf in the Metro Atlantic Athletic Conference (MAAC). The university fields 18 varsity sports, nine men's sports: baseball, basketball, cross country, golf, lacrosse, soccer, and indoor and outdoor track & field; and nine women's sports: basketball, cross country, golf, lacrosse, soccer, softball, indoor and outdoor track & field, and volleyball. The university plans to transition to Division III in 2022.

Club sports
The university sponsors athletics at the club level, including soccer and rugby. The soccer teams are a part of NIRSA League, in the Eastern Connecticut Division. The school's rugby men's team won their collegiate cup in 2017, defeating the Coast Guard academy.

Student media

WWUH operates as a community service of the University of Hartford with an all-volunteer staff of university alumni, faculty, and staff, as well as members of the community.  Operating live 24/7 for the last 30 years, WWUH came on the air on July 15, 1968, as the first stereo public station in the state. WWUH, also known as "UH-FM", offers both music and spoken-word programming that is an alternative to what is heard on other area stations. The station has won the Best Radio Station and Best College Station category in a local newspaper readers' poll numerous times in the last 20 years. WWUH welcomes student volunteers and offers a comprehensive on-air and leadership training program. WWUH's programming can also be heard on WAPJ, 89.9 in Torrington, Connecticut; WDJW, 89.7 in Somers, Connecticut; and WWEB, 89.9 in Wallingford, Connecticut. The station also streams on the web at wwuh.org.

WSAM student-run radio
Founded on February 2, 1974, WSAM is the university's only student-run radio station. It streams its radio shows online through Mixlr. It hosts annual concerts such as Live from the Lawn every opening weekend and a Halloween show every Halloween weekend. It also annually puts out a zine.

The Informer – student newspaper
With a legacy from The Hillyer Callboard, the student newspaper of Hillyer College, dating from the 1920s, the Informer is the official student newspaper of the University of Hartford. Since 1976, the student-run Informer has published 24 times every academic year, coming out every Thursday.  Circulation is 3,000 and the paper is distributed all over campus.

Student Television Network – STN Channel 2
The Student Television Network is a completely student-run station that broadcasts on stn2.tv and their YouTube page. Founded by then-graduate student Chuck King and a group of interested students in 1993, STN became a popular student organization. Though separate from the School of Communication, it provides relevant experience for students pursuing careers in television. STN started its weekly news program broadcast, "STN Channel 2 News," on February 9, 1993. Currently, new broadcasts are live once a week and then played throughout the week. In addition to weekly news broadcasts, STN produces and broadcasts several live Hartford Hawks sports productions throughout the year, and hosts a number of other student-created programs.

Notable alumni
Currently the university has over 94,000 alumni worldwide.

Kenny Adeleke (born 1983), basketball player
Leo Brouwer, musician
Kathleen Clark, playwright
David Cordani, CEO of Cigna
Steve Davis, jazz trombonist
Mark Dion, artist
Jim Ford, actor and stuntman
A. J. Hammer, television host of Showbiz Tonight on CNN, radio personality
Liane Hansen, National Public Radio host of Weekend Edition Sunday
Jack Hardy, singer and songwriter
Seymour Itzkoff, professor, researcher in intelligence
Johnathan Lee Iverson, first black ringmaster of Ringling Bros. and Barnum & Bailey Circus
Wilfred X. Johnson, first black Connecticut state legislator
Jerry Kelly, professional golfer, PGA Tour
Erik Mariñelarena, filmmaker
William J. Murphy, former Speaker of the House of the State of Rhode Island
Peter Niedmann, composer
Chuck Pagano, chief technology officer of ESPN
Tim Petrovic, professional golfer, PGA Tour
Joseph M. Suggs Jr. (B.S. 1978), mayor of Bloomfield and Connecticut State Treasurer (1993–1995)

References

External links

Hartford Athletics website

 
University of Hartford
University of Hartford
Educational institutions established in 1877
Universities and colleges in Hartford County, Connecticut
Tourist attractions in Hartford, Connecticut
Buildings and structures in West Hartford, Connecticut
1877 establishments in Connecticut